Return Jonathan Meigs (born December 28, 1740; died January 28, 1823), a colonel in the Continental Army during the American Revolutionary War, was one of the settlers of the Northwest Territory in what is now the state of Ohio.  He later served the federal government as an Indian agent working with the Cherokee in southeastern Tennessee.

Early life and service in American Revolution
Meigs was born in Middletown, Connecticut, on December 28, 1740, to Jonathan Meigs and Elizabeth Hamlin Meigs. Their thirteen children included his brother Josiah Meigs. His father was a hatter. As a young man, Meigs entered a mercantile business.  He married Joanna Winborn in 1764.  Before her death in 1773, they had four children, including Return Jonathan Meigs Jr.  In 1774, Meigs married Grace Starr, with whom he had three children, of whom two survived.

Meigs served in the local militia, achieving the rank of lieutenant in 1772 and promoted to captain in 1774.  On April 19, 1775, after the Battle of Lexington, he led a company of light infantry to Boston.  There he was appointed major in the 2nd Connecticut Regiment, a provincial regiment of the Continental Army.  Later that year, serving as a division (battalion) commander under Colonel Benedict Arnold, he accompanied Arnold on his 1,100-man expedition through Maine to Canada. He kept a journal of the expedition, making the ink by mixing powder and water in the palm of his hand.  Meigs was captured by the British in the assault on Quebec City and imprisoned, but was paroled on May 16, 1776, by British General Guy Carleton. He was acknowledged to have given decent treatment to a British prisoner, Captain Law, Carleton's chief engineer. Meigs returned to Connecticut by way of Halifax.

After Meigs was formally exchanged on January 10, 1777, he returned to active service as major of the 3rd Connecticut Regiment of the newly organized Connecticut Line.  Meigs was appointed lieutenant colonel of Sherburne's Additional Continental Regiment on February 10, 1777.  On May 12 of that year, he was sent to command the 6th Connecticut Regiment when its colonel, William Douglas, became incapacitated by ill health.

One of his most important achievements during the Revolutionary War was leading the Meigs Raid against the British forces in Sag Harbor, New York, in May 1777.  With just 220 men in a fleet of 13 whaleboats, he crossed Long Island Sound from Connecticut to Long Island to attack the British fleet at night. The raid succeeded in burning twelve ships and taking ninety prisoners without losing a single man. The U.S. Congress awarded Meigs a presentation sword for his heroism.  Colonel Douglas died on May 28, and Governor Trumbull of Connecticut appointed Meigs as the new colonel of the 6th Connecticut on September 10, 1777, with rank counted from May 12.

When a Corps of Light Infantry was formed under General Anthony Wayne in July 1779, Meigs was given command of its 3rd Regiment, which he led at the Battle of Stony Point.  Following its disbandment in December, he returned to the 6th Connecticut and became acting commander of the 1st Connecticut Brigade.  In that capacity, he put down an incipient mutiny and received the written thanks of General George Washington.  On January 1, 1781, the Continental Main Army was reorganized and many of its regiments were consolidated.  As a result, the Connecticut Line was reduced from eight to five regiments and four colonels, including Meigs, were retired.

Ohio
After the Revolution, Meigs was appointed surveyor of the Ohio Company of Associates.  In April 1788, at age 47, he was one of a party of pioneers to the Northwest Territory from New England. They reached the confluence of the Muskingum and Ohio rivers, where he participated in the founding of Marietta, Ohio. Meigs drafted the code of regulations used for governance until the formal creation of the Northwest Territory the following year.

Subsequently, he entered political life, being appointed as a territorial judge, a justice of the peace, and clerk of the Court of Quarter Sessions.  In 1795, he served the army under General Anthony Wayne, as a commissary of clothing in the western country.  In 1799, Meigs was elected as a member of the Ohio territorial legislature, serving until 1801.

Tennessee
In 1801, Meigs went to Tennessee to fill the combined position of US Indian agent to the Cherokee Nation and military agent for the United States War Department. Initially his office and the Cherokee Agency were at Fort Southwest Point, in what is now Kingston, Tennessee. In 1807 he relocated these operations to a new post further south, named Hiwassee Garrison.  It was near the mouth of the Hiwassee River, at its confluence with the Tennessee River. Charles R. Hicks, a mixed-race (European and Cherokee) and bilingual Cherokee, worked as his interpreter for some time.  Hicks later became a chief of the Cherokee.

Meigs' role as military agent ended in 1813 when the Federal soldiers stationed at Hiwassee Garrison were withdrawn. He continued as Cherokee agent on the Hiwassee River until his death on January 28, 1823. The government's trading or factory operations were linked with Indian relations in the War Department during these years.  As Cherokee agent, Meigs promoted the well-being of the Cherokee, defended their rights in treaty negotiations, and encouraged Cherokee efforts to establish a republican form of government. His death was attributed to pneumonia contracted from sleeping outdoors in a tent while giving a visiting Indian chief his own living quarters.

Meigs is buried in the Garrison Cemetery in Rhea County, Tennessee, near the site of the former Hiwassee Garrison.

Legacy
His son Return J. Meigs Jr. was elected as Ohio governor and later, by the legislature, as U.S. Senator.  A grandson, Return J. Meigs IV, married Jennie Ross, daughter of principal Cherokee chief John Ross. They emigrated with her father to Indian Territory in 1838, forced out on the Trail of Tears.

Two Tennessee place names honor Meigs: Meigs County, which was formed in 1836 from part of Rhea County, and Meigs Mountain in the Great Smoky Mountains.

Notes

References

External links

1740 births
1823 deaths
American Revolutionary War prisoners of war held by Great Britain
American surveyors
Continental Army officers from Connecticut
American pioneers
Northwest Territory judges
Northwest Territory House of Representatives
People from Tennessee
Burials in Tennessee
United States Indian agents
Politicians from Middletown, Connecticut
Military personnel from Connecticut
Meigs County, Tennessee
People from Middletown, Connecticut